Arthur William Charles Wentworth Gore (2 January 1868 – 1 December 1928) was a British tennis player.

He is best known for winning three singles titles at the Wimbledon Championship and was runner-up a record 5 times (shared with Herbert Lawford). He also won gold medals at the 1908 Summer Olympics in London, England, winning the Men's Indoor Singles and the Men's Indoor Doubles (with Herbert Barrett). He also competed at the 1912 Summer Olympics in Stockholm, Sweden. Gore's Wimbledon win in 1909, at age 41, makes him the oldest player to date to hold the Wimbledon Gentlemen's Singles title.

Career
He played his first tournament at London Athletic Club in 1887, and his first title came at a grass court tournament in Stevenage in August 1888.  Gore won the singles title at the Scottish Championships in 1892 and successfully defended the title in the Challenge Round in 1893. In 1894 he won the North London Championships  on grass, an event at that tournament that he won five times (1894, 1898, 1899, 1900, 1906).  He won the singles title at the Kent Championships on two occasions; in 1900 by defeating Harold Mahony in the final in straight sets and in 1906 against A.L. Bentley, also in straight sets. In 1900 and 1908 he won the singles title at the British Covered Court Championships, played at the Queen's Club in London. In May 1908 he won the singles title at the British Covered Court Championships, played at the Queen's Club in London, defeating New Zealander Anthony Wilding in the Challenge Round in four sets. Gore had the longest ever span (34 years) in the Wimbledon men's singles (he entered a record 30 times in singles from 1888 to 1922)., In addition he also won the Leicestershire Championships three times (1913, 1914, 1919) and the Nottinghamshire Championships four times (1905, 1910, 1912, 1913). He also holds the all-time record for the longest tennis career of any player between their first and last titles, that being 30 years, 11 months and one day. Gore was a successful all surface player winning 51 singles titles and reaching the finals of 26 other tournaments on clay, grass and hard asphalt & wood courts from 1888 to 1919.

Gore was inducted into the International Tennis Hall of Fame in 2006.

Grand Slam finals

Singles: 8 (3 titles, 5 runner-ups)

Doubles: 3 (1 title, 2 runner-ups)

Performance timeline

Events with a challenge round: (WC) won; (CR) lost the challenge round; (FA) all comers' finalist

Career finals

Singles 77 (51 titles, 26 runner-ups)

See also  
 Gore–Wilding rivalry

References

External links

 
 
 
 

1868 births
1928 deaths
19th-century English people
19th-century male tennis players
English male tennis players
English Olympic medallists
Olympic gold medallists for Great Britain
Olympic tennis players of Great Britain
People from Lyndhurst, Hampshire
International Tennis Hall of Fame inductees
Tennis players at the 1908 Summer Olympics
Tennis players at the 1912 Summer Olympics
Wimbledon champions (pre-Open Era)
Olympic medalists in tennis
Grand Slam (tennis) champions in men's singles
Grand Slam (tennis) champions in men's doubles
Medalists at the 1908 Summer Olympics
British male tennis players
Tennis people from Hampshire